Oakmont is a village and special taxing district in Montgomery County, Maryland, United States. Chartered in 1918, the village includes both sides of Oak Place and the south side of Oakmont Avenue, across Old Georgetown Road from the National Institutes of Health, in the Bethesda postal area. The village has approximately 145 inhabitants in 52 homes.

External links

Oakmont Special Taxing District Web site

1918 establishments in Maryland
Populated places established in 1918
Villages in Maryland
Villages in Montgomery County, Maryland